NIFL may refer to:

Northern Ireland Football League
National Indoor Football League